Sir Richard John Packer, KCB, (born 18 August 1944) is a former British civil servant.  He was Permanent Secretary at Ministry of Agriculture, Fisheries and Food (MAFF) from 1993 until 2000. He was knighted (KCB) in 2000.

Sir Richard Packer was educated at City of London School and initially trained as a scientist at the Victoria University of Manchester. He had a distinguished civil service career being the youngest Permanent Secretary ever appointed to the Ministry of Agriculture, Fisheries and Food, a post he held for seven years until 2000. His earlier career centred on the agricultural and fishing policies of the European Union.

In 2006 his book The Politics of BSE was published by Palgrave. He is a non-executive director of Arla, the largest UK dairy company. He is married to Baroness Neville-Rolfe, with whom he has four sons.

References

External links
"A Policy for Agriculture: Ending State Interference", a pamphlet written by Sir Richard Packer and published by the Centre for Policy Studies, December 2001.

Permanent Secretaries of the Ministry of Agriculture, Fisheries and Food
Spouses of life peers
Living people
Knights Commander of the Order of the Bath
1944 births